The commercial high school (Japanese: 商業高等学校, しょうぎょうこうとうがっこう, shōgyō kōtō gakkō / ), simply called (Japanese: 商業高校, しょうぎょうこうこう, shōgyō kōkō / ), is a Japanese and korean high school which concentrates more on business knowledge and skills rather than the college preparatory courses taught in many Japanese high schools. Most students who graduate from a commercial high school directly enter the work force rather than go to college.

Brief summary
Commercial high schools focus primarily in curriculum designed to teach the skills necessary for success in the business world, though there are a wide variety of fields of study on which to focus. Many students focus on gaining the necessary qualifications and certifications in order to assist them once they begin searching for employment in their specialized field of study.

The Zensho sponsors all kinds of official certifications and conventions.